Cathédrale du Sacré-Cœur may refer to any of these cathedrals:

Africa  
 Cathédrale du Sacré-Cœur d'Alger, Algeria
 Cathédrale du Sacré-Cœur d'Oran, Algeria
 Cathédrale du Sacré-Cœur de Moundou, Chad
 Cathédrale du Sacré-Cœur de Casablanca, Morocco
 Cathédrale du Sacré-Cœur de Bamako, Mali
 Cathédrale du Sacré-Cœur de Brazzaville, Republic of Congo
 Cathédrale du Sacré-Cœur de Lomé, Togo

Asia 
 Cathédrale du Sacré-Cœur de Buôn Ma Thuột, Vietnam

Europe 
 Sacré-Cœur de Paris, France

Oceania
 Cathédrale du Sacré-Cœur de Port Vila, Vanuatu

See also 
 Sacred Heart Cathedral (disambiguation)